Nigel Cochrane (born 12 November 1961) is a Canadian sailor. He competed at the 1988 Summer Olympics and the 1992 Summer Olympics.

References

External links
 

1961 births
Living people
Canadian male sailors (sport)
Olympic sailors of Canada
Sailors at the 1988 Summer Olympics – 470
Sailors at the 1992 Summer Olympics – 470
Sportspeople from Toronto